Salvador "Sal" Magluta is a Cuban American former drug kingpin and powerboat racer who, along with his partner Willy Falcon, operated one of the most significant cocaine trafficking organizations in South Florida history. The duo became known as Los Muchachos, Spanish for "the boys".

Biography

Early life
Salvador Magluta was born into a Cuban family who owned a bakery in the Little Havana neighborhood of Miami, Florida. He and Willy Falcon both dropped out of Miami Senior High School, where they were small-time marijuana dealers before becoming involved in the burgeoning cocaine trade.

1996 trial
Magluta, along with his partner Falcon, was indicted by a federal grand jury in April 1991 for a plethora of drug trafficking crimes, including operating a continuing criminal enterprise accused of importing and distributing over 75 tons of cocaine. Magluta was represented by Roy Black, Martin Weinberg, and Richard Martinez who was Magluta's brother in law. His partner Falcon was represented by Albert Krieger, Susan Van Dusen, and D. Robert "Bobby" Wells. Both Magluta and Falcon were found not guilty after a lengthy trial before Judge Federico Moreno.

Falsifying documents
In 1997, Magluta was sentenced to 9 years for falsifying documents and jumping bail.

Juror bribery
Following the 1996 trial, the United States Attorney's Office directed an investigation into Magluta and Falcon's finances that ultimately revealed that members of their jury - including the jury foreman - had been bribed. Magluta, Falcon, several of the jurors, their associates and even some of their lawyers were ultimately charged with various criminal offenses arising from the conduct. In 2003, Magluta's father and son pled guilty to stashing illegal drug money which was used to bribe jurors and intimidate witnesses.

In 2002, Magluta was tried for bribing jurors, money laundering and obstruction of justice including killing witnesses. He was found guilty on 12 of the 39 counts against him.

Sentencing and imprisonment
Magluta was eventually sentenced to 205 years in federal prison. His sentence was later reduced to 195 years on appeal. He was initially transferred to the supermax federal prison facility in Florence, Colorado. Magluta was later represented by Paul Petruzzi and Richard Klugh and sought a new trial claiming over 40 legal violations.

In popular culture
Magluta and his partner Falcon are the subjects of the 2021 documentary Cocaine Cowboys: The Kings of Miami.

References

20th-century criminals
Living people
Cuban gangsters
Hispanic and Latino American gangsters
Jewish American gangsters
American crime bosses
Cuban drug traffickers
Cuban Jews
People convicted of money laundering
People from Miami
Criminals from Florida
Cuban emigrants to the United States
Cuban prisoners and detainees
Inmates of ADX Florence
21st-century American Jews
1954 births